The División de Honor Femenina 2015–16, or Liga Loterías 2015-16 after sponsorship of Loterías y Apuestas del Estado, was the 59th season of women's handball top flight in Spain since its establishment. Bera Bera, retained the Championship title for a fourth successive season. The season began on 5 September, 2015 and the last matchday was played on 28 May, 2016. A total of 14 teams took part the league, 12 of which had already contested in the 2014–15 season, and two of which were promoted from the División de Plata 2014–15.

Bera Bera won its fourth title in a row. It won the championship with the same points as the 2nd team in the standings, Rocasa G.C. ACE. Further, regarding to European competitions for 2015–16 season; Bera Bera qualified to EHF Champions League, and Rocasa ACE G.C, Prosetecnisa Zuazo, Mecalia Atlético Guardés and Helvetia Alcobendas qualified to EHF Challenge Cup.

Promotion and relegation 
Teams promoted from 2014–15 División de Plata
Jofemesa Oviedo
Aiala Zarautz

Teams relegated to 2016–17 División de Plata
Jofemesa Oviedo
Aiala Zarautz

Teams

Final standings

See also
Liga ASOBAL 2015–16

References

External links
Royal Spanish Handball Federation

División de Honor Femenina de Balonmano seasons
Division de Honor
2015–16 domestic handball leagues
2015 in women's handball
2016 in women's handball